National Retail Systems, Inc. (NRS) includes Keystone Freight Corp. & National Retail Transportation, Inc. (NRT). NRS is an asset based 3PL founded in 1952. It is headquartered in North Bergen, New Jersey, United States.

NRS' hub locations include: New York & New Jersey; Los Angeles, CA; Inland Empire, CA; Savannah, GA; Columbus, OH; Greensboro, NC; and Baltimore, MD.

Equipment
National Retail Systems, Inc. has a fleet of 1,100 power units consisting of conventional over the road line haul tractors, single and double axle local tractors, straight trucks, and yard switchers. The 4300 trailers include 28', 45', 48', and 53' dry vans both swing and roll up doors.

Power
Over the road tractors
Single axle day cabs
Double axle day cabs
Straight trucks
Yard switchers

Trailers
53' Dry Van Trailers
53' Garment on Hanger (GOH) Trailers
48' Dry Van Trailers
48' Garment on Hanger (GOH) Trailers
45' Dry Van Trailers
45' Garment on Hanger (GOH) Trailers
28' Pup Trailers
28' Low Profile Pup Trailers
28' Garment on Hanger (GOH) Trailers

Services
 Consolidation
 Transload
 Truckload/LTL
 Drayage
 Store Delivery
 Dedicated Fleet
 Distribution
 Yard Services

Incidents
On April 20, 2016, an overloaded National Retail Systems vehicle being operated illegally on a non-truck route by Tavaris Owens  struck and killed a cyclist in Brooklyn, New York.

References

External links
 Official website

Companies based in New Jersey
Logistics companies of the United States
Transportation companies of the United States